Fingersoft is a Finnish video game developer based in Oulu. Fingersoft is one of the most northern game studios in the world, located just 170km south of the Arctic Circle. It is best known for the mobile games Hill Climb Racing and Hill Climb Racing 2, which together have over 2 billion installations.

History 
In late 2011 Toni Fingerroos had to make a choice between job hunting and establishing his own business, since all funds reserved for the development of a new game for Sony PlayStation had been spent. He made a bet with himself and started developing mobile applications for Android devices. He worked alone and published new applications every couple of days to see if they would take off. He established Fingersoft in 2012 together with his girlfriend and Teemu Närhi, who became the company's CEO. Fingerroos had come up with the company's name already at the age of 10, when developing his first game. The Rally 94 game could be played on his grandmother's old laptop. In February 2012 he published the Cartoon Camera app, which allowed users to edit their photos to look like sketches or drawings. The app quickly reached 10 million downloads. Fingersoft also published other camera applications that were downloaded tens of millions of times.

The Hill Climb Racing game published in September 2012 was born out of testing physics. The graphics for the game were made in Fingerroos's circle of acquaintances on a freelance basis, but he did the coding entirely on his own working on it 16 hours a day for a couple of months. The new racing game gained visibility in an affordable way, when it was advertised to the users of the camera applications. Other than that, the company spent hardly any money on paid user acquisition. One month after its Android launch, an iOS version of the game was also published. During the first 12 months, the Hill Climb Racing game reached over 100 million downloads. The game gained visibility on the top lists of the most downloaded games on Android phone marketplaces such as Google Play, which consistently generated more downloads. In November 2012, the company had 2 employees and hiring a third employee was being planned.

In 2013 the Hill Climb Racing was the 10th most downloaded game in the United States and the 7th most downloaded game in the whole world. Fingersoft celebrated the milestone of one hundred million downloads and the game's first anniversary by publishing localized versions of the game in Spain, Germany, Russia, France, Poland and Japan. The company's turnover for the first financial year of 14 months was over 15 million euros.

In 2014 the company employed 12 people. In the early days the company's office was a detached house with a Jacuzzi and a pool room. The company also began publishing games developed by other companies, such as the Fail Hard game by Viima Games Oy,  the Pick A Pet mobile game by the Irish company SixMinute  and the Benji Bananas game by Tribeflame.

In September 2015, Fingersoft and the construction company Rakennusteho Group bought a city block in downtown Oulu, where the Department of Architecture of the University of Oulu had previously operated.

In 2016 Fingersoft published the Hill Climb Racing 2 multiplayer game. Fingersoft renovated the premises of the Oulu game campus with Rakennusteho.  Fingersoft invested more than 4 million euros in the new premises. Turnover in 2016 was almost 16 million euros.

In 2017 Fingersoft moved to the Oulu game campus, where the Game Lab of Oulu University of Applied Sciences acted as a tenant and also arranged teaching. The game campus also distributed funding to new game companies. Fingersoft's turnover was close to 30 million euros.

By the year 2018, games published by Fingersoft had been globally downloaded more than one billion times in total. The company did not publish any new games, but its turnover was 21 million euros.

In 2019 Teemu Närhi voluntarily resigned as CEO and became a programmer at Fingersoft. Celine Pasula started as the CEO in late 2019 but was soon succeeded by Jaakko Kylmäoja in February of 2021. 

In early 2020 Fingersoft launched its game on Apple devices in China.

Organization 
Fingersoft's parent company is the Finger Group. Fingersoft's operations are divided so that Fingersoft Oy is responsible for operational game development and Hill Climb Racing Oy owns the hit game's IP. In 2019 Fingersoft employed 55 people.

Fingersoft operates in downtown Oulu on a campus, where it has also collected other local game studios. Toni Fingerroos serves on the company's Board of Directors.

Games 
The company has developed the games Hill Climb Racing and Hill Climb Racing 2. It has also published other games including Benji Bananas, Fail Hard and Make More.

Hill Climb Racing was the 7th most downloaded mobile game in the 2010s globally. Published in 2016, the Hill Climb Racing 2 game reached over 40 million downloads within the first two months. The one billion gamers’ limit in the Hill Climb Racing games was exceeded in April 2018. The sum took into account the original game, its sequel, and a special version made for China. In the Chinese market, Fingersoft cooperates with MyGamez - a company to whose development it has invested in.

Acknowledgements 

 In April 2014, the City of Oulu awarded Fingersoft with the Start Up of the Year entrepreneurship award.
 In 2014, Hill Climb Racing was selected as Finland's best application in the Aalto University’s AppCampus App Awards gala. Thanks to having the biggest number of downloads and votes, it also won the Audience's Favorite App 2014 award
 In 2014, Fingersoft was nominated on the media company Red Herring’s list of Europe's most promising startups. Red Herring has been one of the first to recognize the potential of companies such as Google, Skype and Facebook.
 In January 2016, the Chinese version of Fingersoft's Hill Climb Racing game won the Best Innovation Category at the China Mobile's Outstanding Games of the Year 2015 Awards.

References 

Video game companies of Finland
Video game companies established in 2012
Finnish companies established in 2012
Companies based in Oulu